"Sunset Blvd" is a song by Scott Grimes, which appears on his album, Livin' on the Run. The single was written by Scott Grimes and Dave Harris and produced by Tom Fletcher. The song climbed into the Top 20 of Billboard’s Adult Contemporary chart in April 2005. The song remained in the Top 20 for 10 weeks, peaking at #18. 

Grimes and Harris have stated in interviews that they wrote the song in 20 minutes in early 1999.

The song was featured in a 2007 episode of American Dad! on the Fox Network. Grimes, who does the voice for the teen-aged Steve Smith, sang the song in the episode  "American Dream Factory".

Content
The song tells the story of a young man named Brian who has dreams of making it big in Hollywood, eventually succeeding.

Music video
The music video of "Sunset Blvd", directed by Bryan Pitcher. It stars Jason Gray-Stanford and Grimes and features many of Grimes’ family or friends. The song's co-writer, Dave Harris, is seen as a dock worker in the opening sequences to the video. Mickey Jones also appears in the video as the dock supervisor.

Chart positions

References

2005 singles
Songs about Los Angeles
Songs about streets
Hollywood, Los Angeles in fiction
2005 songs